Agio Christoforos, known before 1927 as Trebishta (Τρέπιστα), is a village in the Kozani regional unit, Greece. It was the seat of the former Agia Paraskevi municipality.

References

Populated places in Kozani (regional unit)